Darius Phillips (born June 26, 1995) is an American football cornerback for the National Football League (NFL). He played college football at Western Michigan and was drafted by the Cincinnati Bengals in the fifth round of the 2018 NFL Draft.

College Career

Phillips played four seasons at Western Michigan.  Starting out as a wide receiver, Phillips caught 32 passes for 479 yards and three touchdowns as a freshman, while also rushing 3 times for 37 yards.  He was converted to defensive back as a sophomore.  In three years on defense, he recorded 127 tackles, 13 tfl, 2 sacks, and 12 interceptions, which returned for 376 yards and 5 touchdowns.  But his primary role was as a kick returner.  He led the MAC conference in kickoff return yards in 2014 and 2016, finishing with 130 kickoff returns for a school record 3,193 yards, which ranked 5th all time in NCAA history.  He returned five kickoffs for touchdowns, while also returning 32 punts for 327 yards and another score.

Professional career

Cincinnati Bengals
Phillips played college football at Western Michigan before being drafted by the Cincinnati Bengals in the fifth round (170th overall) of the 2018 NFL Draft.

In Week 3 of the 2019 season, Phillips recorded his first career interception off Josh Allen in the 21-17 loss. He was placed on injured reserve on September 26, 2019 with a knee injury. He was designated for return from injured reserve on November 21, 2019, and began practicing with the team again. He was activated on November 29, 2019 prior to Week 13. Phillips intercepted a pass thrown by Ryan Fitzpatrick in a Week 16 overtime loss against the Miami Dolphins. He recorded two interceptions during a win against the Cleveland Browns the following week.

Phillips recorded his first interception of the 2020 season during a loss to the Browns in Week 7. He was placed on injured reserve on November 14, 2020; and was activated on December 9, 2020.

On December 14, 2021, Phillips was placed on injured reserve.

Las Vegas Raiders
Phillips signed a one-year contract with the Las Vegas Raiders on March 17, 2022. He was released on August 30, 2022.

Denver Broncos
On September 1, 2022, Phillips was signed by the Denver Broncos. He was placed on injured reserve on December 20.

References

External links
Cincinnati Bengals bio
Western Michigan bio

1995 births
Living people
American football cornerbacks
Cincinnati Bengals players
Denver Broncos players
Las Vegas Raiders players
Players of American football from Detroit
Western Michigan Broncos football players